Shoot to Kill is the debut album of the California punk rock group The X-Pistols, released January 18, 2011 on Suburban Noize Records.

Track listing

Members
 Daddy X
 The Dirtball
 TNT
 Joey Glock
 Colt Clayton
 Featuring James Shevelin (on "Lock Load Fight Win")

References

External links
 Official website
 MySpace.com
 Subnoizestore.com

Suburban Noize Records albums
X-Pistols albums
2011 debut albums